S Antliae is a W Ursae Majoris-type eclipsing binary star in Antlia.

Characteristics
S Antilia is classed as an A-type W Ursae Majoris variable, since the primary is hotter than the secondary and the drop in magnitude is caused by the latter passing in front of the former. S Antilia varies in apparent magnitude from 6.27 to 6.83 over a period of 15.6 hours. The system shines with a combined spectrum of A9V.

The system's orbital period is 0.648 days.  The stars' centres are an average of 3.31 times the sun's radius apart, which places their surfaces just 3.4 times the sun's radius apart. Thus, the two stars will eventually merge to form a single fast-spinning star.

Calculating the properties of the component stars from the orbital period indicates that the primary star has a mass 0.79 times and a diameter 1.46 times that of the Sun, and the secondary has a mass 0.47 times and a diameter 1.13 times that of the Sun. The primary has a surface temperature of 7800 K, while the secondary is a little cooler at 7340 K. The two stars have similar luminosity and spectral type as they have a common envelope and share stellar material. The system is thought to be around two billion years old.

History

The star's variability was first recorded in 1888 by H.M. Paul, when it had the shortest known period of any variable star. It was initially thought to be an Algol-type eclipsing binary, but this was discounted by E.C. Pickering on account of it lacking a shallow minimum in its maximum and the width of its minimum period. Alfred H. Joy noted the similarity of its light curve to W Ursae Majoris in 1926, concluding the system was indeed an eclipsing binary with two stars of spectral type A8.

References

Antlia
082610
W Ursae Majoris variables
Antliae, S
3798
046810
Durchmusterung objects
A-type main-sequence stars